The 2015 Tour de Ski was the 9th edition of the Tour de Ski. The Stage World Cup event began in Oberstdorf, Germany on January 3, 2015, and ended in Val di Fiemme, Italy on January 10, 2015. The titles were being defended by Therese Johaug (Norway) and Martin Johnsrud Sundby (Norway), the former of which came second to Marit Bjørgen, while Sundby initially retained his title until it was passed on to Petter Northug when Sundby was stripped of the title.

On July 20, 2016, Sundby was stripped of the win due to illegal use of asthma medication during the race.

Schedule

Final standings

Overall standings
Final overall standings after all seven stages, with bonus seconds deducted.

Sprint standings
Final sprint standings after all seven stages, all bonus seconds counts.

Stages

Stage 1
3 January 2015, Oberstdorf, Germany – Prologue

Stage 2
4 January 2015, Oberstdorf, Germany

Stage 3
6 January 2015, Val Müstair, Switzerland

Stage 4
7 January 2015, Toblach, Italy

Stage 5
8 January 2015, Toblach, Italy

Stage 6
10 January 2015, Val di Fiemme, Italy

Stage 7
11 January 2015, Val di Fiemme, Italy

References

External links

Tour de Ski
2015
Tour de Ski
Tour de Ski
Tour de Ski
Tour de Ski
January 2015 sports events in Europe